Anna of Holstein-Gottorp (27 February 1575 – 24 April 1610) was a German noblewoman, daughter of Duke Adolf of Holstein-Gottorp and Landgravine Christine of Hesse (daughter of Landgrave Philip I of Hesse).

On 28 January 1598, she married Count Enno III of East Frisia.  They had the following children:
 Anna Maria, Countess of Ostfriesland (1601–1633), married Adolf Frederick I, Duke of Mecklenburg-Schwerin (1588–1658)
 Rudolf Christian, Count of Ostfriesland (1602–1628)
 Ulrich II, Count of Ostfriesland (1605–1648)

Ancestry

References

 

  

Holstein-Gottorp, Anna of
Holstein-Gottorp, Anna of
House of Holstein-Gottorp
Countesses of East Frisia
House of Cirksena
Daughters of monarchs